This page lists board and card games, wargames, miniatures games, and tabletop role-playing games published in 1976.  For video games, see 1976 in video gaming.

Games released or invented in 1976

Significant games-related events of 1976
TSR, Inc. publishes the first issue of Dragon magazine.

References

See also
 1976 in video gaming

Games
Games by year